Zonjić , Зоњић is a surname. Notable people with the surname include:

Alexander Zonjic (born 1951), Canadian flutist
Igor Zonjić (born 1991), Serbian-born Montenegrin footballer
Jovan Zonjić (1907–1961), Serbian painter
Tonči Zonjić (born 1986), Croatian comic artist